Runnymede is a rural locality in the South Burnett Region, Queensland, Australia. In the  Runnymede had a population of 166 people.

History 
Runnymede State School opened on 21 July 1948 and closed on 1964.

In the  Runnymede had a population of 166 people.

References 

South Burnett Region
Localities in Queensland